Luis Zahera (born 1966) is a Spanish actor. He is known for his performances in supporting roles in Galician and Spanish films and television series.

Biography 
Born in 1966 in Santiago de Compostela, Zahera earned early public recognition in his native Galicia for his performance as Petróleo in the series Mareas vivas.

He won the Goya Award for Best Supporting Actor in 2019 for his performance as Cabrera in The Realm.

Filmography 

Television

Film

Accolades

References 

1966 births
Male actors from Galicia (Spain)
Spanish male television actors
Spanish male film actors
20th-century Spanish male actors
21st-century Spanish male actors
Living people